Alessio Luciani (born 16 January 1990) is an Italian footballer who plays for  club Reggiana.

Club career
He made his Serie A debut on 4 October 2009, coming on as an 85th-minute substitute for Simone Del Nero in a 0–0 draw to Fiorentina at the Artemio Franchi.

On 7 July 2021, he signed with Reggiana.

Career statistics 

Statistics accurate as of match played 14 August 2012.

References 

Living people
1990 births
Italian footballers
S.S. Lazio players
F.C. Lumezzane V.G.Z. A.S.D. players
U.S. Salernitana 1919 players
A.S. Gubbio 1910 players
S.S. Arezzo players
A.C. Reggiana 1919 players
Serie A players
Serie C players
Association football midfielders